Hålandsmarka is a village in Sola municipality in Rogaland county, Norway.

Currently, Hålandsmarka is entirely a residential village, with no commercial or industrial areas. Most inhabitants work in the nearby village of Solakrossen and the Stavanger Airport since they are located a short distance to the north.

References

Villages in Rogaland
Sola, Norway